The Ben Ali Handicap was an American Thoroughbred horserace run eleven times between 1917 and 1932 at Lexington Race Course in Lexington, Kentucky. An important race usually run in April or early May, it was open to horses age three and older of either sex. The race was run on dirt over a distance of   furlongs for its final two runnings prior to which it had been contested at  miles (8.5 furlongs).

Historical notes
The Ben Ali Handicap was named for James Ben Ali Haggin, one of America's most prominent owners and breeders, who died in 1914. His horse Ben Ali won the 1886 Kentucky Derby. The most notable winner of the race was Exterminator, the winner of the 1918 Kentucky Derby whose career saw him earn four championships, including American Horse of the Year, plus induction into the United States Racing Hall of Fame.
 
The first edition of the Ben Ali Handicap took place on May 1, 1917 and was won by Colonel Vinnie, an English-bred horse owned by Jefferson Livingston. Between 1923 and 1927 the Ben Ali Handicap was not run. The final edition was held on April 16, 1932 in which Tannery won his second straight Ben Ali Handicap over nine opponents.

The Lexington Race Course ceased to conduct racing in 1933. A race of this same name was introduced at Keeneland Race Course in 1937.

Records
Speed record:
 1:45 flat @ 1 miles - Broadside (1929)

Most wins:
 2 - Tannery (1931, 1932)

Most wins by a jockey:
 2 - Willie Crump (1917, 1929)
 2 - Mack Garner (1920, 1922)

Most wins by a trainer:
 No trainer won this race more than once

Most wins by an owner:
 No owner won this race more than once

Winners

References

Discontinued horse races
Flat horse races for two-year-olds
Recurring sporting events established in 1917
Recurring sporting events disestablished in 1933